The Magritte Award for Best Sound (French: Magritte du meilleur son) is an award presented annually by the Académie André Delvaux. It is one of the Magritte Awards, which were established to recognize excellence in Belgian cinematic achievements. 

The 1st Magritte Awards ceremony was held in 2011 with Benoît Biral, Valene Leroy, Julien Paschal, and Fred Pie receiving the award for their work in A Town Called Panic. As of the 2022 ceremony, Mathieu Cox, Corinne Dubien, Thomas Grimm-Landsberg, and David Vranken are the most recent winners in this category for their work in Playground.

Winners and nominees
In the list below, winners are listed first in the colored row, followed by the other nominees.

2010s

2020s

References

External links
 Magritte Awards official website
 Magritte Award for Best Sound at AlloCiné

Sound